Rajiv Seth (born 5 November 1968) is an Indian former cricketer. He played first-class cricket for Bengal and Orissa. In 2022, he was serving as the Project Director at Odisha Naval Tata Hockey High Performance Centre in Bhubaneswar, Odisha.

See also
 List of Bengal cricketers

References

External links
 

1968 births
Living people
Indian cricketers
Bengal cricketers
Odisha cricketers
Cricketers from Delhi